Edy Cabrera (born August 14, 1977) is a Guatemalan football defender who currently plays for Deportivo Malacateco in Guatemala's top division.

Club career
Cabrera is the older brother of national team stalwart Gustavo and both started playing football at JuCa de Izabal before moving to Guatemalan giants Comunicaciones. The brothers were separated when Edy joined Cobán Imperial. He later moved on to Deportivo Jalapa and had a second, short, spell at Comunicaciones before joining Juventud Retalteca in 2009.

International career
Cabrera made his debut for Guatemala as a late substitute in a January 2000 friendly match against Panama and earned a total of 6 caps, scoring no goals. He has represented his country in 2 FIFA World Cup qualification matches.

External links

References

1976 births
Living people
People from Izabal Department
Guatemalan footballers
Guatemala international footballers
Comunicaciones F.C. players
C.D. Malacateco players
Association football defenders